Mohamed Helal (8 October 1995) is an Egyptian professional football player who currently plays for National Bank of Egypt as a midfielder.

Club career 

Helal made his professional debut at 3 December 2014 against SV Zulte Waregem in a 2-1 away defeat in the Belgian Cup. He played the full game.

References

1996 births
Living people
Egyptian footballers
Egyptian expatriate footballers
Lierse S.K. players
Wadi Degla SC players
Belgian Pro League players
Place of birth missing (living people)
Association football midfielders